Henry Kent Hewitt (February 11, 1887 – September 15, 1972) was the United States Navy commander of amphibious operations in north Africa and southern Europe through World War II. He was born in Hackensack, New Jersey and graduated from the United States Naval Academy in 1907. His classmates included Jonas H. Ingram, George M. Courts, Claud A. Jones, and Willis W. Bradley.

Early career
Hewitt served aboard  in the Great White Fleet's circumnavigation of the globe from 1907–1909. His sea duty continued as a division officer aboard  and executive officer of the destroyer . In 1913 he was promoted to lieutenant, married Floride Louise Hunt (1887–1973), and began three years of shore duty as a Naval Academy mathematics instructor. He returned to sea in 1916 commanding the yacht  in the Caribbean. Hewitt was awarded the Navy Cross commanding the destroyer  escorting Atlantic convoys during World War I. His citation reads:

Hewitt was an instructor of electrical engineering and physics at the Naval Academy from 1919 to 1921 before returning to sea as gunnery officer aboard . After spending three years at the Naval War College in Newport, Rhode Island, he commanded Destroyer Division Twelve with the battle fleet from 1931 to 1933. He then chaired the Naval Academy mathematics department for three years while the Naval Academy developed the Keuffel & Esser Log Log Trig slide rule.  He returned to sea commanding the cruiser  and transported President Franklin D. Roosevelt to the Pan-American Conference at Buenos Aires following the 1936 elections.

Flag rank during World War II
Hewitt was promoted to rear admiral in 1939, and commanded Atlantic Fleet Task Groups in neutrality patrols and convoys from 1941 until becoming Commander, Amphibious Force, Atlantic Fleet, in April 1942. This force, also called Task Force 34, became the U.S. component of the Operation Torch landings in November 1942. Hewitt was then assigned as Commander, U.S. Naval Forces, Northwest Africa Waters or COMNAVNAW. His flagships included  while he commanded American naval forces at the Naval Battle of Casablanca,  while he commanded the western task force during the invasion of Sicily, and  while he commanded all Allied amphibious forces during the invasion of Italy and later Anzio landings and invasion of southern France.

Hewitt was awarded both the Army and Navy Distinguished Service Medals for his part in the invasion of North Africa. The Navy Distinguished Service Medal citation reads:

The Army Distinguished Service Medal citation reads:

Hewitt was awarded a second Navy Cross for his part in the invasion of Italy. The citation reads:

Hewitt was awarded a second Army Distinguished Service Medal for his part in the invasion of southern France. The citation reads:

Hewitt was awarded a second Navy Distinguished Service Medal as commander of the United States Eighth Fleet for the last two years of the war. The citation reads:

Post-war
Hewitt remained in this post until 1945, when he chaired a Pearl Harbor investigation. Following World War II, he commanded U.S. Naval Forces Europe, advised the Naval War College, and served as a Navy representative to the United Nations. Hewitt retired from active duty to Orwell, Vermont in 1949. and died at Middlebury, Vermont in 1972.  was named in his honor.

Honors and awards

There is a display of Admiral Hewitt's orders, decorations and medals at the United States Naval War College Museum in Newport, Rhode Island.

References

Further reading

 Hindley, Meredith (2017). Destination: Casablanca: exile, espionage, and the battle for North Africa in World War II (2017). New York, New York, U.S.A.: PublicAffairs/Hachette Book Group. .

1887 births
1972 deaths
People from Hackensack, New Jersey
Naval War College alumni
Recipients of the Navy Cross (United States)
Recipients of the Distinguished Service Medal (US Army)
Recipients of the Navy Distinguished Service Medal
Officiers of the Légion d'honneur
Recipients of the Croix de Guerre 1939–1945 (France)
Recipients of the Order of Kutuzov, 1st class
Knights Grand Cross of the Order of Orange-Nassau
United States Naval Academy alumni
United States Navy World War II admirals
United States Navy admirals
Military personnel from New Jersey